Elizabeth Mason (June 9, 1880 – June 13, 1953) was an American sculptor. Her work was part of the sculpture event in the art competition at the 1932 Summer Olympics.

References

1880 births
1953 deaths
20th-century American sculptors
American women sculptors
Olympic competitors in art competitions
People from Jacksonville, Illinois
20th-century American women artists